"Please Read the Letter" is a song originally written and recorded by Jimmy Page and Robert Plant (as Page and Plant) for their 1998 album Walking into Clarksdale.

Plant and Alison Krauss later recorded a version of the song for their collaboration album Raising Sand released in October 2007. The song was well received by critics, and won the Record of the Year award at the 2009 Grammy Awards.

Music and lyrics
"Please Read the Letter" is in the folk rock genre.

Plant explained that "Please Read the Letter" is a song about yearning for someone, adding that the lyrics are about "unfinished business".

Release
A music video for the single was released in 2008. It was shot in a 1905-built house in South Los Angeles.
The music video was nominated for Wide Open Country Video of the Year at the 2009 CMT Music Awards.

Robert Plant and Alison Krauss version

Chart performance
Plant and Krauss' version of the song initially failed to chart, but after winning the Grammy Award for Record of the Year, the song entered the Billboard Bubbling Under Hot 100 chart at #20 (the virtual equivalent to #120 on the Hot 100) in 2009.

Reception
The song has been well received by critics. Chris Jones, in his review for the BBC, felt that the version by Plant and Krauss is "completely improved" from the original track. Thom Jurek wrote for Allmusic: "Slow, plodding, almost crawling, Krauss' harmony vocal takes it to the next step, adds the kind of lonesome depth that makes this a song whispered under a starless sky rather than just another lost love song."

Track listing
2008 US CD single (Rounder RPAK102-R1)

"Please Read the Letter" (Radio Edit) (Jones, Lee, Page, Plant) – 3:47
"Please Read the Letter" (Jones, Lee, Page, Plant) – 5:55

References

Songs about letters (message)
1998 songs
2008 singles
Robert Plant songs
Alison Krauss songs
Jimmy Page songs
Grammy Award for Record of the Year
Songs written by Robert Plant
Songs written by Jimmy Page
Song recordings produced by T Bone Burnett
Song recordings produced by Jimmy Page